Toure Kazah-Toure (1959 - 1 July 2017) was a Nigerian academic, activist, and pan-Africanist. His admiration for founding Guinean president, Ahmed Sékou Touré, led to his adoption of the name "Toure". He was a history lecturer and researcher at Ahmadu Bello University (ABU), Zaria, Nigeria, with a number of publications in his name.

Early life
Kazah-Toure, born in 1959 in Atyapland, Northern Region, British Nigeria (now part of southern Kaduna State, Nigeria), was the son of Kazah Yashim, the second Atyap formally-trained teacher and first person from Southern Kaduna to be appointed at the District Council (of the defunct Northern Region) in 1954. He came from a mixed Christian and Muslim family, with his dad being a Christian and a few other family members being Muslims, 12 of whom were killed in the 1992 Zangon Kataf crises, the aftermath of which he, himself, became a Muslim.

Working career
He lectured with the History department of the Ahmadu Bello University (ABU), Zaria, Kaduna State, Nigeria. He

Activism
Toure regarded the ideas of Nationalism and Christianity as the sell out of the Nigerian elite to imperialism, as he moved to Pan-Africanism from Nationalism, and got immersed in the epistemic community called the Council for the Development of Social Science Research in Africa (CODESRIA). He, from early times was involved in organising people in his native area to support the radical ferments and gained the nickname "PRP", and did thought strategically and planned for the platform managing the Students' Union of Ahmadu Bello  University, Zaria, the Movement for Progressive Nigeria (MPN), while still a student there.

Academic publications
 Sole author
He authored the following:

 "Inter-Ethnic Relations, Conflicts and Nationalism in Zango Katab Area of Northern Nigeria: Historical Origins and Contemporary Forms" (1995) (A paper presented at the 8th CODESRIA General Assembly, Dakar, Senegal.)

 "The Political Economy of Ethnic Conflicts and Governance in Southern Kaduna, Nigeria: [De]Constructing a Contested Terrain" (1999)

 "Ethno-religious Conflicts in Kaduna State" (2003)

 "A Discourse on the Citizenship Question in Nigeria" (2005)

 "Transcending Myths and Mystifications: Challenge of Ethnic and Religious Conflicts in Northern Nigeria in the 21st Century" (A paper presented at the 21st CODESRIA General Assembly, 5-9 December, 2011, Rabat, Morocco.)

 Co-author
He was also a co-author in the following works:

 "Ethno-religious Conflicts in Northern Nigeria" (co-authored with Professor Jibrin Ibrahim)

 Inclusive citizenship and democratic governance in Nigeria in "The geographies of citizenship in Nigeria" (2003)

 "Beyond State Failure and Collapse: Making the State Relevant in Africa" (2007)

 Identity Conflicts: Belonging and Exclusion in Zangon Katab in  "Citizenship and Indigeneity Conflicts in Nigeria" (2012).

 The Imposition of British Colonialism on Atyapland, 1902-1928; and The Atyap Anti-Colonial Movement, 1929-1960 in "A Short History of the Atyap" (2019).

 "newsfrom the Nordic Africa Institute" (2020)

Conferences
He was mentioned in conferences such as:
 African State-Formation and Bureaucracy in Comparative Perspective conference: Held between 16 – 18 September 2013 at the University of the Witwatersrand, Johannesburg

Demise
He died of a long ailment at 1:30 PM on 1 July 2017, at the age of 58.

References
In-citations

Footnote

20th-century Nigerian historians
Academic staff of Ahmadu Bello University
Nigerian pan-Africanists 
Nigerian activists 
Atyap people 
People from Kaduna State
2017 deaths
1959 births
21st-century Nigerian historians